Jívka is a municipality and village in Trutnov District in the Hradec Králové Region of the Czech Republic. It has about 600 inhabitants. A part of Jívka called Dolní Vernéřovice has well preserved folk architecture and is protected by law as a village monument zone.

References

Villages in Trutnov District